Second scholasticism (or late scholasticism) is the period of revival of scholastic system of philosophy and theology, in the 16th and 17th centuries. The scientific culture of second scholasticism surpassed its medieval source (Scholasticism) in the number of its proponents, the breadth of its scope, the analytical complexity, sense of historical and literary criticism, and the volume of editorial production, most of which remains hitherto little explored.

Scotism and Thomism
Unlike the "First", i.e. medieval scholasticism, a typical feature of second scholasticism was the development of schools of thought, developing the intellectual heritage of their "teacher". Two schools survived from earlier phases of scholasticism, Scotism and Thomism. The Scotists, mostly belonging to the various branches of the Franciscan order, include the Italians Antonius Trombetta, Bartolomeo Mastri, Bonaventura Belluto; the Frenchman Claude Frassen, the Irish emigrants Luke Wadding, John Punch, and Hugh Caughwell; and the Germans Bernhard Sannig and Crescentius Krisper. The Thomists were usually but not exclusively represented by the Iberians in the Dominican and the Carmelite orders. They include Thomas Cajetan (or Caietanus), Domingo de Soto, Domingo Báñez, Franciscus Ferrariensis, the Complutenses, João Poinsot and others.

Jesuit scholasticism
The intellectual influence of second scholasticism was augmented by the establishment of the Society of Jesus (1540), by Ignatius Loyola, per approval of Pope Paul III. The "Jesuits" are considered a third "school" of second scholasticism, although this refers more to the common style of academic work rather than to some common doctrine. The important figures include Pedro da Fonseca, Antonio Rubio, the Conimbricenses, Robert Bellarmine, Francisco Suárez, Luis de Molina, Gabriel Vásquez, Pedro Hurtado de Mendoza, Rodrigo de Arriaga, and many others.

There were also many "independent" thinkers like Sebastián Izquierdo, Juan Caramuel y Lobkowicz, Kenelm Digby, Raffael Aversa etc.

Decline and legacy
The golden age of Second Scholasticism was the first decades of the 17th century, at which time it was still largely in control of university curricula in philosophy. But second scholasticism started to decline under the attacks of philosophers writing in vernacular languages, such as Descartes, Pascal and Locke, and from the competition from more experimental and mathematical ways of doing science promoted by the Scientific Revolution. It was largely dormant from the onset of Enlightenment in the end of the 17th century, although scholastics such as Suarez remained influential for a long period. In some Iberian universities the scholastic culture remained vivid well into the 19th century, providing background for the birth of Neo-Scholasticism.

Interest in the thought of the late scholastics has been recently revived by the journal Studia Neoaristotelica.

See also 

 Scholasticism
 School of Salamanca

References

Bibliography 
 Manlio Bellomo, The Common Legal Past of Europe, 1000-1800, Washington, D.C. The Catholic University of America Press, 1995.

 Josef Bordat and Johanna M. Baboukis, "Late Scholasticism". In: Oxford International Encyclopedia of Legal History. New York 2009.
 James Franklin, "Science by Conceptual Analysis: The Genius of the Late Scholastics", Studia Neoaristotelica 9 (2012), 3–24.
 James Gordley, The Philosophical Origins of Modern Contract Doctrine, Clarendon Press, Oxford 1991, ch. 3.
 Paolo Grossi, La Seconda scolastica nella formazione del diritto privato moderno, Giuffrè, Milan, 1973.
 Anneliese Maier (1949–58) Studien zur Naturphilosophe der Spätscholastik, 5 Bande 
 Daniel D. Novotný, "In defense of Baroque scholasticism", Studia Neoaristotelica 6 (2009), 209–233.
 Daniel D. Novotný, Ens rationis from Suárez to Caramuel: A Study in Scholasticism of the Baroque Era, New York, Fordham University Press, 2013.
Daniel Schwartz, The Political Morality of the Late Scholastics: Civic Life, War and Conscience, Cambridge: Cambridge University Press, 2019.

External links
Scholasticon by Jacob Schmutz Online Resources for the study of early-modern scholasticism (1500–1800): authors, sources, institutions

Scholasticism